The Yuecheng Mountains, also known as Laoshanjie (老山界), are a mountain range  that lies on the border between Hunan Province  and the Guangxi Zhuang Autonomous Region, of the People's Republic of China. The range is part of the Nanling Mountains of Central China. Its highest peak is Shenmaoding of Kitten Mountain, and its second peak is Zhenbaoding (also called Beibaoding).

The Yuecheng Mountains run from the northeast to the southwest.

References

Ranges of the Nanling Mountains
Mountain ranges of China
Geography of Central China
Mountain ranges of Hunan
Landforms of Guangxi